__NoToC__
Lucius Pedanius Secundus (d. AD 61) was a Roman senator of the first century.  In AD 43, during the reign of Claudius, he was consul suffectus from the Kalends of March to the Kalends of July, together with Sextus Palpellius Hister. Secundus was the first senator from the Spanish provinces to achieve the rank of consul since the anomalous tenure of Lucius Cornelius Balbus in 40 BC.

In the year 56, he was appointed praefectus urbi by Nero.  Few details of his tenure are known; only that he was murdered in the year 61 by one of his slaves.  The senate, moved, among others, by Gaius Cassius Longinus, approved the execution of all of Pedanius' four hundred slaves, in accordance with Roman law; an abridged version of Longinus' speech was preserved by Tacitus. The people demanded the release of those slaves who were innocent, but Nero deployed the Roman army to prevent the mob from disrupting the executions.

The Pedanii had their roots as Roman colonists in the town of Barcino in Tarraconensis. Secundus' descendants include a series of consuls, beginning with his son Gnaeus Pedanius Fuscus Salinator, consul in AD 61.

See also
 Pedania (gens)

Footnotes

References

External links
 Tacitus, Annales xiv. 42–45

Suffect consuls of Imperial Rome
Urban prefects of Rome
61 deaths
Year of birth unknown
Ancient Roman murder victims
Secundus